Technical Education Quality Improvement Programme is a project of Government of India assisted by World Bank. The project was implemented to improve the quality of education in the technical institutions of India.

Funding

TEQIP Phase 1
The Project was declared effective on March 12, 2003 and closed on March 31, 2009 (with an extension of 9 months).

References

External links 

 Project description on MHRD website
 Project description on AICTE website

Government schemes in India